Pyralis transcaspica is a species of snout moth. It is found in Turkmenistan.

References

Moths described in 1903
Pyralini